Re: Person I Knew is a live album by jazz pianist Bill Evans with Eddie Gómez and Marty Morell recorded at the Village Vanguard in New York City in 1974 and released on the Fantasy label in 1981. Additional recordings from Evans' 1974 Village Vanguard performances were also issued on the album Since We Met (1974). The name of the album (and its title-track) is an anagram on the name of Orrin Keepnews, who produced for Evans while he was signed with Riverside Records, and who was one of his earliest champions.

Reception
The Allmusic review by Scott Yanow awarded the album 3 stars and states: "even though the results fall short of classic, they should interest Bill Evans collectors".

Track listing
All compositions by Bill Evans except as indicated
 "Re: Person I Knew" - 5:20
 "Sugar Plum" - 8:17
 "Alfie" (Burt Bacharach, Hal David) - 4:59
 "T.T.T. (Twelve Tone Tune)" - 5:31
 "Excerpt from Dolphin Dance/Very Early" (Herbie Hancock/Bill Evans) - 7:26
 "34 Skidoo" - 6:05
 "Emily" (Johnny Mandel, Johnny Mercer) - 5:17
 "Are You All the Things" - 6:21
Recorded at the Village Vanguard, New York City, on January 11 & 12, 1974.

Personnel
Bill Evans - piano
Eddie Gómez - bass
Marty Morell - drums

Discography

References

Bill Evans live albums
1981 live albums
Albums produced by Orrin Keepnews
Fantasy Records live albums
Albums recorded at the Village Vanguard